Shaunna Marie Polley (born 14 December 1993) is a New Zealand beach volleyball player. 

Polley was in the New Zealand's first women's beach volleyball team to compete at the Games in 2018 with then partner Kelsie Wills. 
The pair won a bronze medal at the Ulsan Open in South Korea on the 2017 FIVB Beach Volleyball World Tour.

Polley and playing partner Alice Zeimann will be representing New Zealand at the 2022 Commonwealth Games.

References

External links
 
 

1993 births
Living people
New Zealand beach volleyball players
Women's beach volleyball players
Beach volleyball players at the 2018 Commonwealth Games
Commonwealth Games competitors for New Zealand
Beach volleyball players at the 2022 Commonwealth Games